The 11th Pan American Games were held in Havana, Cuba from August 2 to August 18, 1991.

Medals

Gold

Men's 100 m butterfly: Anthony Nesty

Silver

Women's 1500 metres: Letitia Vriesde

Men's 200 m butterfly: Anthony Nesty

Bronze

Men's 800 metres: Tommy Asinga

Results by event

See also
Suriname at the 1992 Summer Olympics

References

Nations at the 1991 Pan American Games
P
1991